G-MOSAIC (GMES services for Management of Operations, Situation Awareness and Intelligence for regional Crises) is a GMES Security Pilot Project financed by the European Commission 7th Framework Programme. G-MOSAIC will develop products, methodologies and pilot services for the provision of geo-spatial information in support of the external relations policies of the Union in support to the prevention and management of external Regional Crisis (and the relevant intervention) for, e.g. peace keeping, peace enforcing, crisis prevention, people and citizens rescue.

Objectives 
G-MOSAIC Service Domains are characterised in order to deal with EU Security related to "out of EU Crisis Areas ", focusing on:
Support intelligence and early warning, with the objective to deploy and validate those information services which contribute to the analysis of the causes leading to regional crises. One important aspect is the development of crisis indicators, based on the assessment – also through satellite derived data - of crisis precursor elements such as: natural resource and land degradation, water scarcity; food security issues, population pressure, impacts of climate change, health epidemics; illegal activities and trafficking, weapons proliferation.
Support Crisis Management Operations, with the objective of deploying and validating those information services which contribute to support the planning for EU intervention during crises, the EU intervention and citizen repatriation during crises, the crisis consequences management, reconstruction & resilience.

Figures 
  Start date: January 1, 2009
  Project Duration: 36 months
  Consortium: 36 partners
  Total Cost: 15 MEuro
  EC contribution: 9,6 MEuro

Services 
The following table shows the main G-MOSAIC Services versus the GMES  Areas for actions in the Security Domain

Notes

External links 
 G-MOSAIC Project web site
 GMES R&D website, operated by the EC-funded SWIFT project 
 EC GMES  web site
 ESA GMES web site
 LIMES Project web site

Copernicus Programme
Space policy of the European Union